Century House, also known as Brick House and Beauregard's Headquarters, is a historic plantation house located near Ridgeway, Fairfield County, South Carolina.  It was built about 1853, and is a large, two-story brick house in the Greek Revival style. It features double-tiered, balustraded piazzas. During the American Civil War, Century House entertained and sheltered many refugees from Low Country South Carolina and Georgia and also served as the headquarters for General P. G. T. Beauregard and his staff when Columbia was evacuated upon the approach of Gen. William Tecumseh Sherman’s Army in 1865.

It was added to the National Register of Historic Places in 1971.

References

Plantation houses in South Carolina
Houses on the National Register of Historic Places in South Carolina
Greek Revival houses in South Carolina
Houses completed in 1853
Houses in Fairfield County, South Carolina
National Register of Historic Places in Fairfield County, South Carolina